Pavithradevi Wanniarachchi is a Sri Lankan lawyer and politician. The current Minister of Wildlife and Forest Conservation, she is a Member of Parliament from the Ratnapura District.

Early life and education
Pavithradevi Wanniarachchi was born on 10 November 1964, as the eldest daughter of Dharmadasa Wanniarachchi and Podi Menike Weerasekera Wanniarachchi. Her father was a senior politician and was the former governor of the Wayamba Province in 2003 before which he held the post of Deputy Minister Industries and Scientific Affairs. From 1967 to 1977, he represented the Palmadulla seat in the Parliament. He was re-elected to Parliament in 2000 and in 2004 was appointed as the governor of the North Western Province. She has one sister, Prasanna Devi Wanniarachchi, who is a lawyer.

Wanniarachchi attended the Pelmadulla Mahinda Vidyalaya for her primary education. She then entered Gankanda Central College and Anula Vidyalaya Nugegoda for her secondary education. She was the Head Prefect, leader of the debating team, president of the Buddhist Association, Member of the Western band and the Captain of the 1st Volleyball Team of Anula Vidyalaya. She then entered Sri Lanka Law College in 1985 and took oaths as an attorney of law of the Supreme Court of Sri Lanka five years later.

Political career 
In 1990 she entered politics on the invitation of the former Prime Minister Sirimavo Bandaranaike. In 1991 she was appointed as the chief organizer for Kalawana. She then became a member of the Sabaragamuwa Provincial Council in 1993 and in 1994 she entered Parliament as an MP representing the Ratnapura District.

After entering politics, she has held many posts both in the local and central governments. In 1994 she held the post of Deputy Minister of Health, Highways, Social Services and Welfare and in 1998 the post of Deputy Minister of Health & Indigenous Medicine. In the year 2000 she was elected as the Deputy Secretary of the Sri Lanka Freedom Party, the Leader of the Women's wing of the Sri Lanka Freedom Party and Minister of Plan and Implementation.

In 2002, while she was serving as the organiser of the Eheliyagoda seat for SLFP in 2008, she was appointed as the Chairman of the Commonwealth Youth Ministers Convention and also served as the Minister for Youth Affairs.

Between 2004 and 2015 she held many post while the SLFP lead coalition was in power. In 2004 she was appointed Minister of Samurdhi & Poverty Alleviation, 2007 Minister of Youth Affairs, 2010 she was appointed as the Minister of Cultural and National Heritage and later that year as the Minister of Technology and Atomic Research.

The periods between 2001 - 2004 and 2015 - 2019 she was an active member of the opposition of the Parliament.

From 2019 she was appointed as the Minister of Women & Child Affairs, Social Security, Health & Indigenous Medicine in government headed by the new President Gotabhaya Rajapaksa.

Post Held 

 Minister of Women & Child Affairs, Social Security, Health & Indigenous Medicine: 2019–Present
 Minister of Power & Energy: 2013 - 2015
 Minister of Technology & Research 2010 - 2013
 Minister of Cultural Affairs & National Heritage: 2010
 Chairman of Commonwealth Youth Ministers Convention: 2008
 Minister of Youth Affairs: 2007 - 2010
 Minister of Samurdhi & Poverty Alleviation: 2004 - 2007
 Minister of Plan & Implementation: 2000 - 2001
 Deputy Minister of Health & Indigenous Medicine: 1998 - 2000
 Deputy Minister of Health, Highways, Social Services & Welfare: 1994 - 1998
 Member of the Parliament for Ratnapura District: 1994–Present
 Member of the Sabaragamuwa Provincial Council: 1993 - 1994

Other Responsibilities 
 Deputy Secretary of the SLFP: 2000 onwards
 Leader of the SLFP Women's Wing: 2000 onwards
 Chief Organizer of the Eheliyagoda Seat for the SLFP: 2002 onwards
 Chief Organizer of the Kalawana Seat of the SLFP: 1991 to 2002

Family 

Pavithra Wanniarachchi's husband is Kanchana Jayaratne, who is the Chairman of the Sabaragamuwa Provincial Council and also serves as her Private Secretary.  She has two daughters.

Notes

See also
List of political families in Sri Lanka
Cabinet of Sri Lanka

References

External links

Members of the Sabaragamuwa Provincial Council
Women legislators in Sri Lanka
Living people
Members of the 10th Parliament of Sri Lanka
Members of the 11th Parliament of Sri Lanka
Members of the 12th Parliament of Sri Lanka
Members of the 13th Parliament of Sri Lanka
Members of the 14th Parliament of Sri Lanka
Members of the 15th Parliament of Sri Lanka
Members of the 16th Parliament of Sri Lanka
Sri Lanka Freedom Party politicians
United People's Freedom Alliance politicians
1964 births
People from Ratnapura
Culture ministers of Sri Lanka
Power ministers of Sri Lanka
20th-century Sri Lankan women politicians
21st-century Sri Lankan women politicians
Women government ministers of Sri Lanka